Speed Up Losers (말달리자) is the official debut studio album by Korean rock band Crying Nut. The title track became a hit single. This album sold over 100,000 copies despite being released by an indie label. Due in part to this album, Crying Nut is credited for introducing punk rock to the Korean public.

Track listing

Personnel 
 Park, Yoon-Sick  – vocal, guitar
 Lee, Sang-Myun  – guitar, vocal 
 Han, kyung-Rock  – bass, vocal
 Lee, Sang-Hyuk  – drums

References

External links

1998 debut albums
Korean-language albums